Abdel Aziz Tahir (born 27 July 1961) is a Moroccan wrestler. He competed at the 1984 Summer Olympics and the 1988 Summer Olympics.

References

1961 births
Living people
Moroccan male sport wrestlers
Olympic wrestlers of Morocco
Wrestlers at the 1984 Summer Olympics
Wrestlers at the 1988 Summer Olympics
Place of birth missing (living people)